Louis Marino Palatella (born July 28, 1933) is a former American football player who played for San Francisco 49ers of the National Football League (NFL).

Early life
Palatella played football for Vandegrift High School.

College career
Palatella played college football at the University of Pittsburgh.

Professional career

San Francisco 49ers
Palatella played as a guard and a linebacker with the San Francisco 49ers for four seasons.

Later career
After retiring from football, Palatella became a liquor distributor in Southern California. He owns a tequila company and a bourbon distillery in Bardstown, Kentucky, which his wife Marci and he opened in 2018.

Personal life 
Lou Palatella is married to Marci Palatella who was charged in connection to 2019 college admissions bribery scandal and is facing mail fraud charges for allegedly paying $575,000 to a nonprofit that allegedly assisted in her son’s SAT test and conspiring to bribe a University of Southern California athletic director to designate her son as a football recruit. Following her arrest, Marci pled not guilty and was released on a $1,000,000 unsecured bond. She would appear in court. On August 24, 2021, Marci reversed course and agreed to plead guilty. The next day, she officially pled guilty to conspiracy to commit honest services mail fraud. On December 16, 2021, Marci was sentenced to six weeks in prison, a $250,000 fine, two years of supervised release, with a condition of home confinement for the first six months of supervised release, and 500 hours of community service, as previously recommended by both the prosecution and defense.

References

1933 births
Living people
American football guards
People from Vandergrift, Pennsylvania
Players of American football from Pennsylvania
Pittsburgh Panthers football players
San Francisco 49ers players